In computational number theory, Cipolla's algorithm is a technique for solving a congruence of the form

where , so n is the square of x, and where  is an odd prime. Here  denotes the finite field with  elements; . The algorithm is named after Michele Cipolla, an Italian mathematician who discovered it in 1907.

Apart from prime moduli, Cipolla's algorithm is also able to take square roots modulo prime powers.

Algorithm

Inputs:
 , an odd prime,
 , which is a square.

Outputs:
 , satisfying 

Step 1 is to find an  such that  is not a square. Therefore, the expected number of trials before finding a suitable  is about 2.

Step 2 is to compute x by computing  within the field extension . This x will be the one satisfying 

If , then  also holds. And since p is odd, . So whenever a solution x is found, there's always a second solution, -x.

Example

Find all x such that 

Therefore, the Legendre symbol  has to be equal to 1. This can be computed using Euler's criterion:  This confirms 10 being a square and hence the algorithm can be applied.
 Step 1: Find an a such that  is not a square. As stated, this has to be done by trial and error. Choose . Then  becomes 7. The Legendre symbol  has to be −1. Again this can be computed using Euler's criterion:  So  is a suitable choice for a.
 Step 2: Compute  in :

Indeed,

Proof
The first part of the proof is to verify that  is indeed a field. This  can roughly be seen as analogous to the complex number i.
The field arithmetic is quite obvious. Addition is defined as
.
Multiplication is also defined as usual. With keeping in mind that , it becomes
.
Now the field properties have to be checked.
The properties of closure under addition and multiplication, associativity, commutativity and distributivity are easily seen. This is because in this case the field  is somewhat resembles the field of complex numbers (with  being the analogon of i).
.
.
The only thing left for  being a field is the existence of additive and multiplicative inverses. In fact, those are the additive inverse elements of x and y. In other words,
.
So the two equalities  and  must hold.
,
.
This completes the first part of the proof, showing that  is a field.

The second and middle part of the proof is showing that for every element .
Euler's criterion then says that
.
Thus . This, together with Fermat's little theorem (which says that  for all ) and the knowledge that in fields of characteristic p the equation  holds, a relationship sometimes called the Freshman's dream, shows the desired result
.

The third and last part of the proof is to show that if , then .
Compute
.

Speed
After finding a suitable a, the number of operations required for the algorithm is  multiplications,  sums, where m is the number of digits in the binary representation of p and k is the number of ones in this representation. To find a by trial and error, the expected number of computations of the Legendre symbol is 2. But one can be lucky with the first try and one may need more than 2 tries. In the field , the following two equalities hold

where  is known in advance. This computation needs 4 multiplications and 4 sums.

This operation needs 6 multiplications and 4 sums.

Assuming that  (in the case , the direct computation  is much faster) the binary expression of  has  digits, of which k are ones.

For this, Cipolla's algorithm is better than the Tonelli–Shanks algorithm if and only if , with  being the maximum power of 2 which divides .

Prime power moduli 

According to Dickson's "History Of Numbers", the following formula of Cipolla will find square roots modulo powers of prime:

 where  and 
 where ,  as in this article's example

Taking the example in the wiki article we can see that this formula above does indeed take square roots modulo prime powers.

As

Now solve for  via: 

(See  here for mathematica code showing this above computation, remembering
that something close to complex modular arithmetic is going on here) 

As such:

   and 

and the final equation is:

  which is the answer.

References

Sources
 E. Bach, J.O. Shallit Algorithmic Number Theory: Efficient algorithms MIT Press, (1996)
 Leonard Eugene Dickson History of the Theory of Numbers Volume 1 p218 

Modular arithmetic
Number theoretic algorithms
Articles containing proofs